The 2007 Bihar flood, which started in August 2007, was described by the United Nations as the worst flood in the "living memory" of Bihar. It is believed to be the worst flood in Bihar in the last 30 years. By 3 August, the estimated death toll was 41 people, and 48 schoolgirls were marooned in a school in the Darbhanga district. By 8 August, the flooding had affected an estimated 10 million people in Bihar. Army helicopters delivered food packets to Bihar residents and 180 relief camps were established. By 10 August, aid workers in Bihar reported that there was a dramatic increase of people with diarrhoea and by 11 August, flood deaths were still occurring. Total deaths recorded in 2007 Bihar floods was 1,287, which was second highest death toll in state after 1,399 deaths in 1987 Bihar floods.

Incident

The states of Bihar and Uttar Pradesh were the most affected due to their high population density. Nearly two million people, spread over eleven districts in Bihar, grimly endured the floods. Many major rivers, including the Ganges, Punpun, Bagmati, Gandak and Kosi, were flowing above danger mark.

Flooding had submerged more than 40 percent of Bihar. Rainfall in July was five times higher than the monthly average over a 30-year period. The area around the town of Darbhanga was one of the worst affected areas in the state. Roads leading to the remainder of the state were impassible by the flood. Many people had to seek shelter on higher ground and many people were marooned. Some people lamented that help from the state authorities was not forthcoming.

Affected areas
The flood affected 19 districts of the state. Some of the worst affected districts are Muzaffarpur, Sitamarhi, Saharsa, East Champaran, Supaul, Darbhanga, Patna, Bhagalpur, West Champaran, Katihar, Madhubani, Samastipur, Sheohar, Nalanda, Khagaria, Gopalganj, Madhepura, Araria and Begusarai.

Impact

At least 4,822 villages and 10,000,000 hectares of farm land were affected. About 29,000 houses were destroyed and 44,000 houses were damaged by the floods. Thousands of people were shifted to places of safety, including relief camps.

Response
The United Nations described the flood, the worst to occur in the living memory of Bihar.

Relief work

Assistance recommended by CRF
The general recommendations suggest that a flood victim would be entitled to, a compensation of Rs. One lakh to the next of kin for every deceased person subject to certification by a competent authority. Compensation packages for fully damaged pucca house- Rs 25,000/-, Fully damaged kachcha house – Rs. 10,000/-, Severely damaged pucca house Rs 5,000/-, Severely damaged Kachcha house – Rs 2,500/-, Partially damaged pucca and kachcha house – Rs 1,500/-, Hut- Rs 2,000/- Compensation of Rs 35,000/- to any person injuring his eyes / limbs with damage between 40 and 75 per cent. Beyond that the compensation would be Rs 50,000/- compensation for grievous injury with hospitalization up to one week –  Rs. 2,500/-. For hospitalization of more than a week, the compensation would be Rs. 7,500/- lost clothing and utensils Rs 1,000/- per family. Immediate sustenance – Rs. 20/- per adult per day and Rs. 15/ per child per day for 15 days. This can be extended to 30 days in case of extreme situation. Rs 2/- per day per infant for additional nutrition as per ICDS norms for a maximum period of 30 days. De-silting of agricultural land with minimum sand casting depth of  3 inches – Rs. 6,000/- per hectare for small and marginal farmers. Renovation of Fish Farm – Rs 6,000/- land lost due to changing course of rivers Rs. 15,000/- per hectare subject to establishing the ownership. An agricultural input subsidy of Rs. 2,000/- for small and marginal farmers in rain fed areas and Rs. 4,000/- per hectare in assured irrigation areas. Rs. 6,000/- agriculture input subsidy for perennial crop. These benefits are also available to other farmers with a ceiling of one hectare. Subsidy for cattle lost as under (a) Milch Cattle like buffalo, cow and camel – Rs 10,000/-, (b) Draught Animal like Camel, horse or bullock – Rs 10,000/-, (c) Calf/ Donkey and Pony – Rs. 5,000/- and (d) Sheep / Goats Rs. 1,000/-, Birds – Rs 30/ per bird. Fishermen losing their traditional craft, Partly – Rs 2,500/- +net; Fully Rs 7,500/- +Net. Besides, there are various other provisions that a flood victim is entitled. Similar assistance is available for other artisans like weavers etc. subject to certification from the competent authority.

Assistance implemented
Grain (38,86,896 Qtls) distributed to affected families was around 50 lakhs. For emergency expenses (Rs 20/- per adult and Rs 15/- per child) that a person is entitled for, GoB had, till August 2008, paid Rs. 84.05 Crores against a demand of Rs. 1105 Crores made to the Center. This was just about 8 per cent of the requirement.

As far as CRF is concerned, there are no unlimited funds available with it. In the past five years Bihar has received only Rs.123.66 Crores in 2000–01, Rs. 129.84 in 2001–02, Rs. 136.33 Crores in 2002–03, Rs. 143.15 Crores in 2003–04 and Rs. 150.30 Crores in 2004–05. GoB is supposed to add 25 per cent more to this sum to claim the Central assistance. One can well imagine the gap that exists between the available small funds to the tune of Rs. 150 Crores against a demand of Rs. 8,000 Crores. Some money may be available through the channels of National Calamity Contingencies Fund (NCCF) but that too is drop in the ocean. The rest will have to be borne by the state Government or by the affected family itself. GoB asserts that it has spent all the money that it had with it (Rs. 850 Crores) to meet the flood disaster this year and it has further spent a sum of Rs. 250 Crores from other sources and has no money left to do any relief any more unless some help pours in from outside. The Chief Minister has requested the Center to allocate funds for that but such requests have a history of getting ignored.

See also
2008 Bihar flood
2008 Indian floods
Koshi river
Floods in Bihar
2004 Bihar flood

References 

Bihar flood
Floods in Bihar
2007 floods in Asia
2007 in Nepal